"Take Me Home" is a song written and performed by English drummer, singer and songwriter Phil Collins. It is the tenth and final track on Collins' third solo album, No Jacket Required. Collins co-produced the song with Hugh Padgham and released it as a single in the UK in July 1985 and the U.S. in March 1986. It did moderately well in the UK, peaking at No. 19. While it was not as successful as other singles from the album, such as "Sussudio" or "One More Night" in the US, it still reached the top 10, peaking at No. 7. 

In a readers poll, Rolling Stone ranked "Take Me Home" number five on their list of ten best Collins songs.

Background

Meaning
The song lyrics refer to a patient in a mental institution and it is influenced by the Ken Kesey novel One Flew Over the Cuckoo's Nest.

Guest appearances
While recording "Long Long Way to Go," Collins asked Sting, former Genesis bandmate Peter Gabriel, and Helen Terry to provide backing vocals.

Extended Mix
The "extended mix" of "Take Me Home", released on the 12-inch single, was one of the six songs to be included on Collins' 12"ers album. Remixer John "Tokes" Potoker created an edited extended mix of the song for the Japanese release of 12"ers, removing around one and half minutes from the full length mix.

Music video
The music video, directed by Jim Yukick and produced by Paul Flattery, features Collins getting into a Ford Popular and singing a line of the song in various places around the world, including London, Paris, Tokyo, New York City, Sydney, Bremen, Memphis (Graceland), Los Angeles (Hollywood), Stockholm, San Francisco, Kamakura, Chicago, St. Louis and Houston. Filming was completed on location when Collins' subsequent No Jacket Required World Tour was staged at the corresponding locale.

Reception
Reception for the song was mostly positive. Jan DeKnock of the Chicago Tribune said that the song was "hypnotic". Geoff Orens of AllMusic said that the song was an AMG Track Pick, and that the "pulsating 'Take Me Home' utilizes the drama of 'In the Air Tonight' on a more wistful track". David Fricke of Rolling Stone said that the song had "engaging, circular rhythm and languid melodic texture". Marty Racine of the Houston Chronicle thought that "Take Me Home" was one of the few songs that "[rose] above the crowd [on the album]".  Cash Box called it "an urgent ballad" with "intensity and hummable refrain"  Billboard called it an "introspective mood piece of melancholy and defiance."

Covers, remakes, and usage in media
"Take Me Home" appeared on the opening episode of the second season of the popular crime show Miami Vice, much like Collins' own "In the Air Tonight" appeared in the series premiere a year earlier. The song was included on the Miami Vice II soundtrack album. The song was also the closing theme song for the World Wrestling Federation's television show, Saturday Night's Main Event, for several years in the late 1980s.

"Take Me Home" appeared on the Phil Collins tribute album Urban Renewal, as performed by Malik Pendleton.

In 2003, the hip-hop group Bone Thugs-n-Harmony based their song "Home" on this single. That version of the song featured the original song's chorus, and reached No. 19 in the UK. Collins appeared in the music video to sing the chorus.

In 2014, R&B singer JoJo included her own revamped interpretation of "Take Me Home" on her three-track Valentine's Day EP, #LoveJo. The cover, which features production from Da Internz, was praised for JoJo's vocals and the incorporation of trap and 808 beats. "The clear standout is her version of Phil Collins’ 'Take Me Home,' all militant stomp buried under ambient noise," said Sam Lansky of Time magazine. "Her voice soars and crashes over the glitchy, stuttering beat."

In 2016, the extended mix was prominently used in a scene from the season 2 premiere episode of USA's television series Mr. Robot, in which an executive of the show's villainous corporation is blackmailed into publicly burning $5.9 million of his own company's money.

Track listings
All songs were written by Phil Collins, except where noted.

7-inch vinyl single

12-inch vinyl single

CD single

Personnel 
 Phil Collins – lead and backing vocals, keyboards, drums, Roland TR-909
 Daryl Stuermer – guitars
 Leland Sklar – bass, Piccolo bass
 Peter Gabriel – backing vocals 
 Sting – backing vocals
 Helen Terry – backing vocals

Chart performance

References

External links
 [ allmusic review]

1985 singles
1986 singles
1980s ballads
Atlantic Records singles
Phil Collins songs
Pop ballads
Rock ballads
Song recordings produced by Hugh Padgham
Songs written by Phil Collins
Song recordings produced by Phil Collins
1985 songs